John Michael Hardwick (born September 21, 1958) is an American voice actor, comedian, writer, producer and YouTuber. He is best known as the voice of Dale Gribble in the animated American television show King of the Hill. He served as staff writer, story editor, and producer for the show as well. He has four Prime Time Emmy nominations and in 1999 he won an Emmy Award for his work as a producer on King of the Hill.

Biography and career
A native of Austin, Texas, John Hardwick attended Texas Tech University in Lubbock, Texas. After graduation with a BS degree in Journalism, he worked for a decade as a bartender in live blues bars in Dallas and Austin, Texas including Nick's Uptown, Sixth Street Live, and The Greenville Bar & Grill. Starting in 1990 he then performed stand-up comedy for a number of years, appearing at such venues as the Dallas Improv and the Velveeta Room in Austin, Texas and appearing on shows like Evening at the Improv and Caroline's Comedy Hour. He was the first stand-up comedian to appear on The Jon Stewart Show. In 1995, Hardwick appeared at the Montreal Comedy Festival, where Brandon Tartikoff saw him and offered him a sitcom for NBC. However, after Hardwick proposed a comedy along the lines of Green Acres and Get a Life the network showed little interest in seriously pursuing the idea.

After Hardwick signed with the Strauss-McGarr agency, he was continually booked doing stand-up comedy in both Austin and all over the United States. He was originally planned to be a regular in MTV's Austin Stories— but left to help create King of the Hill. While at the Laugh Factory in Los Angeles, Hardwick performed a comedy set about his father in Texas. After the show, he was approached by television writer and producer Greg Daniels and Beavis and Butt-Head's Mike Judge, who were helping to put together King of the Hill at the time. Daniels and Judge felt Hardwick's Texan humor was just what the show needed and offered him a job writing for the fledgling program. Hardwick moved from Austin to Silver Lake, Los Angeles, California to work for the show. Hardwick's first day working for King of the Hill was one day after NBC's option on his sitcom development deal expired (thus making it legal for Hardwick to pursue a sitcom with another network).

The role of Dale Gribble was originally offered to Daniel Stern, but producers were unable to agree with Stern on a salary. Instead, Hardwick won the voice role, having no interest whatsoever in how much money was involved. Hardwick performed the role for the entire 13-year run of the successful show and appeared in 257 of 258 episodes.

On September 12, 2012, Hardwick created his own YouTube channel, though it did not see any upload activity until 2015. In December 2018, Hardwick started regularly uploading new content. As of April 2020, his channel had 11,100 subscribers and had received 426,000 views, with videos primarily consisting of song parodies and monologues in the voice of Dale Gribble.

Filmography

Film

Television

Video games

Production credits

References

External links

Living people
1963 births
American male comedians
American humorists
Male actors from Austin, Texas
Male actors from Houston
American male voice actors
Texas Tech University alumni
20th-century American comedians
21st-century American comedians
Comedians from Texas
Screenwriters from Texas
Television producers from Texas